Vladimir Iosifovich Levenshtein (20 May 1935 – 6 September 2017) was a Russian scientist who did research in information theory,  error-correcting codes, and combinatorial design. Among other contributions, he is known for the Levenshtein distance and a Levenshtein algorithm, which he developed in 1965.

He graduated from the Department of Mathematics and Mechanics of Moscow State University in 1958 and worked at the Keldysh Institute of Applied Mathematics in Moscow ever since. He was a fellow of the IEEE Information Theory Society.

He received the IEEE Richard W. Hamming Medal in 2006, for "contributions to the theory of error-correcting codes and information theory, including the Levenshtein distance".

Life 
Levenshtein graduated from Moscow State University in 1958, where he studied in the faculty of Mechanics and Mathematics. After graduation he worked at the M.V Keldysh Institute of Applied Mathematics.

Publications
 
 
 
 V.I. Levenshtein, Application of Hadamard matrices to a problem in coding theory, Problems of Cybernetics, vol.  5, GIFML, Moscow, 1961, 125–136.
 
 
 
 V.I. Levenshtein, On the stable extension of finite automata, Problems of Cybernetics, vol.  10, GIFML, Moscow, 1963, 281–286.
 V.I. Levenshtein, On some coding systems and self-tuning machines for decoding messages, Problems of Cybernetics, vol.  11, GIFML, Moscow, 1964, 63–121.
 V.I. Levenshtein, Decoding automata invariant with respect to the initial state, Problems of Cybernetics, vol.  12, GIFML, Moscow, 1964, 125–136.
 
 
 V.I. Levenshtein, Binary codes providing synchronization and correction of errors, Abstracts of short scientific reports of the International Congress of Mathematicians, Section 13, Moscow, 1966, 24.
 V.I. Levenshtein, Asymptotically optimal binary code with correction of occurrences of one or two adjacent characters, Problems of Cybernetics, vol.  19, Science, Moscow, 1967, 293–298.
 V.I. Levenshtein, On the redundancy and deceleration of separable coding of natural numbers, Problems of Cybernetics, vol.  20, Nauka, Moscow, 1968, 173–179.
 
 
 
 
 
 
 V.I. Levenshtein, Elements of coding theory, In the book.  Discrete mathematics and mathematical questions of cybernetics, Nauka, Moscow, 1974, 207–305.
 .
 VI Levenshtein, Methods for obtaining bounds in metric problems of coding theory, Proc.  of the 1975 IEEE-USSR Joint Workshop on Information Theory, New York, 1976, 126–143.
 
 
 V.I. Levenshtein, On the choice of polynomials for obtaining boundaries in packaging problems, VII All-Union Conference on the Theory of Coding and Information Transfer, Part II, Moscow - Vilnius, 1978, 103–108.
 
 
 V.I. Levenshtein, Borders for packaging of metric spaces and some of their applications, Problems of cybernetics, vol.  40, Science, Moscow, 1983, 43–110.
 VI Levenshtein, Packing of polynomial metric spaces, Third International Workshop on Information Theory, Convolutional codes;  multi-user communication, Sochi, 1987, 271–274.
 
 VI Levenshtein, Perfect deletion-correcting codes as combinatorial designs, Proc.  of the Second International Workshop: Algebraic and Combinatorial Coding Theory, Leningrad, USSR, 1990, 137–140.
 .
 VI Levenshtein, Designs as maximum codes in polynomial metric spaces, Acta Applicandae Mathematicae, vol. 29 (1992), 1-82.
 VI Levenshtein, Bounds for self-complementary codes and their applications, in Eurocode-92.  CISM Courses and Lectures, vol.  339. Springer-Verlag, Wien-New-York, 1993, 159–171.
 VI Levenshtein, Bounds for codes as solutions of extremum problems for systems of orthogonal polynomials, Applied Algebra, Algebraic Algorithms and Error-Correcting Codes, Lectures Notes in Computer Science, vol.  673, Springer-Verlag, 1993, 25–42.

 
 T. Ericson and VI Levenshtein, Superimposed codes in the Hamming space, IEEE Trans.  Inform.  Theory, vol.  40, no.  6 (1994), 1882–1893.
 G. Fasekas and VI Levenshtein, On upper bounds for code distance and covering radius of designs in polynomial metric spaces, J. Combin.  Th.  Ser.  A, vol.  70, no.  2 (1995), 267–288.
 T. Helleseth, T. Klove, VI Levenshtein, and O. Ytrehus, Bounds on the minimum support weights, IEEE Trans.  Inform.  Theory, vol.  41, no.  2 (1995), 432–440.
 VI Levenshtein, Krawtchouk polynomials and universal bounds for codes and designs in Hamming spaces, IEEE Trans.  Inform.  Theory, vol.  41, no.  5 (1995), 1303–1321.
 .
 VI Levenshtein, Reconstructing binary sequences by the minimum number of their subsequences or supersequences of a given length.  Proceedings of Fifth Intern.  Workshop on Algebr.  and Combin.  Coding Theory, Sozopol, Bulgaria, June 1–7, 1996, 176–183.
 VI Levenshtein, Lower bounds on crosscorrelation of codes.  Proceedings of IEEE Fourth Intern.  Symp  on Spread Spectrum Techniques and Appl., Mainz, Germany, September 22–25, 1996, 657–661.
 VI Levenshtein, Split orthogonal arrays and maximum independent resilient systems of functions, Designs, Codes and Cryptography, vol.  12, no.  2 (1997), 131–160.
 T. Helleseth, T. Klove, and VI Levenshtein, On the information function of an error-correcting code, IEEE Trans.  Inform.  Theory, vol.  43, no.  2 (1997), pp. 549–557.
 
 P. Delsarte and VI Levenshtein, Association schemes and coding theory, IEEE Trans.  Inform.  Theory, vol.  44, no.  6 (1998), 2477–2504.
 VI Levenshtein, Universal bounds for codes and designs, in Handbook of Coding Theory, VS Pless and WC Huffman, Eds., Amsterdam: Elsevier, vol.  1, 499–648, 1998.
 VI Levenshtein, On designs in compact metric spaces and a universal bound on their size, Discrete Mathematics, vol.  192 (1998), 251–271.
 VI Levenshtein, On the maximum T-wise independent systems of Boolean functions, Workshop on Coding and Cryptography, Paris, France, 1999, 367–370.
 VI Levenshtein, Equivalence of Delsarte's bounds for codes and designs in symmetric association schemes and some applications, Discrete Mathematics, vol.  197/198 (1999), 515–536.
 VI Levenshtein, New lower bounds on aperiodic crosscorrelation of binary codes, IEEE Trans.  Inform.  Theory, vol.  45, no.  1 (1999), 284–288.
 IN AND.  Levenshtein, On designs in continuous unit cubes, Proceedings of the IV International Conference: Discrete models in the theory of control systems, Moscow State University, MAKS Press, 2000, 62–64.
 VI Levenshtein, Efficient reconstruction of sequences, IEEE Trans.  Inform.  Theory, vol.  47, no.  1 (2001), 2-22.
 VI Levenshtein, Efficient reconstruction of sequences from their subsequences or supersequences, Journal of Combin.  Theory, Ser.  A, vol.  93, no.  2 (2001), 310–332.
 T. Berger and VI Levenshtein, Asymptotical efficiency of two-stage testing, IEEE Trans.  Inform.  Theory, vol.  48, no.  7 (2002), 1741–1749.
 T. Berger and VI Levenshtein, Application of cover-free codes and combinatorial designs to two-stage testing, Discrete Applied Mathematics.
 T. Helleseth, T. Klove and VI Levenshtein, Hypercubic 4 and 5-designs from double-error-correcting BCH codes, Designs, Codes and Cryptography.
 VI Levenshtein, A universal bound for a covering in regular posets and its application to pool testing, Discrete Mathematics.
 
 VI Levenshtein, Combinatorial problems motivated by comma-free codes, Discrete Mathematics.

See also
Association scheme
Bose–Mesner algebra
Levenshtein automaton
Levenshtein coding

References

External links
Levenshtein's personal webpage - in Russian
March 2003 pictures of Levenshtein at a professional reception.
 Another (better) picture from the same source
 

Russian mathematicians
Soviet mathematicians
1935 births
2017 deaths
Coding theorists
Information theorists
Moscow State University alumni
Russian information theorists
Fellow Members of the IEEE
Jewish scientists
Russian Jews